The 2019 WNBA Finals, officially WNBA Finals 2019 presented by YouTube TV for sponsorship reasons, was the best-of-five championship series for the 2019 season of the Women's National Basketball Association (WNBA).  The Finals featured the top seeded Washington Mystics facing off against the second seed Connecticut Sun.  The Washington Mystics defeated the Connecticut Sun through five turbulent games, with the Mystics winning the odd-numbered games and the Sun emerging victorious through the even-numbered games, exploiting a temporary absence of Elena Delle Donne and drawing upon unrelenting resolve to keep the series going, to make their bid for a championship that ultimately failed after the Mystics resurged in Game 5's final quarter.  This was the first-ever Finals win for the Washington Mystics, as well as the Connecticut Sun's third Finals appearance.

Road to the Finals

Standings

Playoffs

Summary

This finals was the third time in the four years since the WNBA switched playoff formats in 2016 that two teams from the same conference met in the WNBA Finals. In 2016 and 2017, two teams from the Western Conference met. This would be the first time two teams from the Eastern Conference met in the Finals. This Finals is also the third time that the top two seeds have made it to the finals since the WNBA switched playoff formats in 2016. The lone non-top two seed to make the finals was the third seeded Washington Mystics in 2018.

The Mystic's home court advantage figured to play a critical role in these finals. The Mystics had a 14–3 home record during the regular season and the Connecticut Sun had a 15–2 regular season home record. However, the Mystics had a regular season away record advantage 12–5 vs. 8–9. The Sun won the regular season series 2–1, with the home team winning each game.

Game 1

Ariel Atkins turned around her recent poor form to lead the Mystics to a win in Game 1 of the Finals.  Atkins was 5–21 during the Mystic's semifinal series, but scored 21 points in Game 1 of the Finals on 6–7 shooting.  Additionally, Elena Delle Donne and Emma Meesseman played for the Mystics.  This was a change from the regular season series, where both players did not play.  Delle Donne in particular made her presence felt, leading the Mystics with twenty-two points and ten rebounds.  The Sun got a big performance from Courtney Williams, who scored a game high twenty-six points.  However, the Sun's bench contributed only eight total points, while the Mystic's bench scored sixteen.

Game 2

Elena Delle Donne only played 3:20 of the first quarter before experiencing back spasms that saw her miss the remainder of the game.  The Sun took advantage of the League MVP's absence and won Game Two by twelve points.  The Sun were led by Jonquel Jones who achieved the WNBA Finals' first ever thirty point and fifteen rebound game.  Jones finished with thirty-two points and eighteen rebounds.  The Mystics were able to tie the score at seventy-six, with eight minutes remaining, but Jones re-entered the game after sitting on the bench with four fouls.  She returned to the game and helped the Sun finish off the win.  With the series tied at one game apiece, the series heads to Connecticut for the next two games.  The Sun now have home court advantage in the series.

Game 3

Elena Delle Donne played through her herniated disk and contributed 13 points in the Mystics road win.  Washington got out to a hot start, going up fifteen points in the first quarter.  They then took a five point lead into halftime and never looked back, winning by thirteen points.  Their road win brings them within one game of the WNBA Championship.  The Mystics had four players score in double figures, with two reaching over twenty points.  The Sun also had four players score in double figures, but none reached the twenty point mark.

Game 4

The Sun stormed out to a fifteen point lead in the first quarter and held off a late Mystics charge to win Game 4, and force a deciding Game 5.  The Mystics made a run after halftime, winning the third quarter by sixteen points, and tying the game going into the fourth quarter, but it was not enough to overcome the Sun.  Alyssa Thomas starred for the Sun, coming within two rebounds of the first WNBA Finals triple double.  Jonquel Jones also recorded a double double for the Sun.  The Mystics lead by five at one point in the fourth, but the Sun hit two three pointers to gain the lead for good with 2:22 left.  Connecticut went four for four on free throws in the last minute to seal the game.

Game 5

Game five was a tight affair in the first half, with the Sun taking a one point lead into half time.  The game continued to be close in the third quarter.  The Sun took a two point lead into the final period.  However, season MVP Elena Delle Donne scored four of her twenty-one points during an 8–0 run with three minutes left to seal the win for the Mystics.  The Mystics won the fourth quarter by thirteen points, and the game by eleven.  The win secured the Mystic's their first title in franchise history, and leaves the Sun still looking for their franchise's first title.  Emma Meesseman lead the Mystics in scoring, with twenty two points.  She was named the Finals MVP and became the first bench player to win the award.  Jonquel Jones lead the Sun with twenty-five points and Alyssa Thomas had twenty-one points and twelve rebounds, but it was not enough to overcome the Mystics.

Team Rosters

References

External links
WNBA Playoffs Home

Women's National Basketball Association Finals
Finals
WNBA Finals
WNBA Finals
Connecticut Sun
Washington Mystics
Basketball competitions in Washington, D.C.
Basketball competitions in Connecticut
Sports competitions in Uncasville, Connecticut